Glenariff or Glenariffe ( or ) is a valley in County Antrim, Northern Ireland. It is one of the Glens of Antrim. Like other glens in that area, it was shaped during the Ice Age by giant glaciers.

It is sometimes called the 'Queen of the Glens', and is the biggest of the Glens of Antrim and visited by most tourists. The village of Waterfoot lies on the coast at the foot of the glen.

A popular tourist destination is the Glenariff Forest Park with its trails through the trees and alongside waterfalls.

References 

Culture Northern Ireland
 "A Glimpse at Glenariffe" - Book  (1997) by Robert Sharpe and Charles McAllister traces the history of the glen using maps, 17th century hearth rolls and school records.

Glens of County Antrim
Northern Ireland coast and countryside